Elachista is a genus of gelechioid moths described by Georg Friedrich Treitschke in 1833. It is the type genus of the grass-miner moth family (Elachistidae). This family is sometimes (in particular in older sources) circumscribed very loosely, including for example the Agonoxenidae and Ethmiidae which seem to be quite distinct among the Gelechioidea, as well as other lineages which are widely held to be closer to Oecophora than to Elachista and are thus placed in the concealer moth family Oecophoridae here.

These grass-miners are very small moths with the "feathery" hindwings characteristic of their family. They are essentially found worldwide, except in very cold places and on some oceanic islands; as usual for Gelechioidea, they are most common in the Palearctic however. They usually have at least one, sometimes as many as three light bands running from leading to trailing edge of their forewing uppersides. Some species, however, have upper forewings that are mostly white.

Selected species
Not all species of this large genus have been discovered yet, let alone validly described and named. Several small genera, e.g. Biselachista and Cosmiotes, are here included in Elachista as junior synonyms (see below). They seem to be at least as closely related to E. bifasciella (the type species of the present genus) than other species commonly placed here, if not actually closer. In addition, Elachista contains several cryptic species complexes – such as the one around E. dispunctella and E. triseriatella – whose systematics and taxonomy are still not fully resolved.

A number of Elachista species have been assigned to one of several groups, which may or may not be monophyletic, and whose names in the literature do not consistently follow the usual taxonomic practice (i.e. using as namesake the group-member which was described first). Some of these groups are placed in either of the two large subgenera Elachista (Aphelosetia) and Elachista (Elachista). Other proposed subgenera – the small Elachista (Dibrachia) and Elachista (Hemiprosopa) – are here included in the species of unclear relationships; like some small species-groups, they stand a chance of rendering the two larger subgenera paraphyletic if accepted as distinct, but seem too unlike them to warrant placement in either.

Subgenus Elachista (Aphelosetia)argentella group (sometimes in bedellella group)

 Elachista acenteta
 Elachista achrantella
 Elachista adempta
 Elachista adianta
 Elachista anagna
 Elachista aphyodes
 Elachista apina
 Elachista arena
 Elachista argentella (type of Aphelosetia)
 Elachista argillacea
 Elachista aspila
 Elachista aurocristata
 Elachista conidia
 Elachista coniophora
 Elachista controversa
 Elachista dissona
 Elachista epimicta
 Elachista granosa
 Elachista griseicornis
 Elachista hololeuca
 Elachista inopina
 Elachista ischnella
 Elachista lamina
 Elachista lomionella
 Elachista loriella
 Elachista louisella
 Elachista lurida
 Elachista nubila
 Elachista nucula
 Elachista orestella
 Elachista ossuaria
 Elachista patriodoxa
 Elachista perniva
 Elachista ripula Kaila, 1998
 Elachista sabulella
 Elachista scobifera
 Elachista sincera
 Elachista spatiosa
 Elachista symmorpha
 Elachista synopla
 Elachista thelma
 Elachista triangulifera
 Elachista triatomea
 Elachista virgatula Kaila, 1997 (type of Aphigalia)bedellella/unifasciella group (including collitella group)

 Elachista adscitella Stainton, 1851
 Elachista antonia Kaila, 2007
 Elachista bedellella (Sircom, 1848)
 Elachista bisulcella (Duponchel, [1843])
 Elachista bruuni Traugott-Olsen, 1990
 Elachista camilla Kaila, 2007
 Elachista cahorsensis Traugott-Olsen, 1992
 Elachista chrysodesmella Zeller, 1850
 Elachista cingillella (Herrich-Schäffer, 1855)
 Elachista collitella (Duponchel, [1843])
 Elachista crocogastra Meyrick, 1908
 Elachista dispilella Zeller, 1839
 Elachista dispunctella (Duponchel, [1843])
 Elachista distigmatella Frey, 1859
 Elachista dorinda Kaila, 2007
 Elachista fasciola Parenti, 1983
 Elachista festucicolella Zeller, 1853
 Elachista gangabella Zeller, 1850
 Elachista gregori Traugott-Olsen, 1988
 Elachista heinemanni Frey, 1866 (sometimes in E. subalbidella; tentatively placed here)
 Elachista istanella Nielsen & Traugott-Olsen, 1987
 Elachista laetella Rebel, 1930 (sometimes in E. subalbidella; tentatively placed here)
 Elachista levasi Sruoga, 1998
 Elachista littoricola Le Marchand, 1938
 Elachista lugdunensis Frey, 1859
 Elachista metella Kaila, 2002
 Elachista nedaella Traugott-Olsen, 1985
 Elachista nitidulella (Herrich-Schäffer, 1855)
 Elachista nolckeni Sulcs, 1992 (tentatively placed here)
 Elachista obliquella Stainton, 1854
 Elachista pollinariella Zeller, 1839
 Elachista pollutissima Staudinger, 1880
 Elachista pullicomella
 Elachista purella Sruoga, 2000
 Elachista revinctella Zeller, 1850
 Elachista rudectella Stainton, 1851
 Elachista slivenica Kaila, 2007
 Elachista squamosella (Duponchel, [1843])
 Elachista subalbidella
 Elachista subocellea
 Elachista sutteri Kaila, 2002
 Elachista tinctella Sinev & Sruoga, 1995
 Elachista titanella Kaila & Jalava, 1994
 Elachista triseriatella Stainton, 1854
 Elachista unifasciella (Haworth, 1828)
 Elachista versicolora Kaila, 2007
 Elachista cf. dispunctella 'Volgograd Oblast'Elachista (Aphelosetia) incertae sedis

 Elachista acutella Kaila, 2003
 Elachista aeruginosa Parenti, 1981
 Elachista afghana Parenti, 1981
 Elachista agelensis Traugott-Olsen, 1996
 Elachista amparoae Traugott-Olsen, 1992
 Elachista amseli Rebel, 1833
 Elachista andorraensis Traugott-Olsen, 1988
 Elachista anitella Traugott-Olsen, 1985
 Elachista arduella Kaila, 2003
 Elachista arenbergeri Traugott-Olsen, 1988
 Elachista atrisquamosa Staudinger, 1880
 Elachista baldizzonei Traugott-Olsen, 1996
 Elachista baldizzonella Traugott-Olsen, 1985
 Elachista bazaella Traugott-Olsen, 1992
 Elachista bazaensis Traugott-Olsen, 1990
 Elachista bengtssoni Traugott-Olsen, 1992
 Elachista berndtiella Traugott-Olsen, 1985
 Elachista bigorrensis Traugott-Olsen, 1990
 Elachista blancella Traugott-Olsen, 1992
 Elachista casascoensis Traugott-Olsen, 1992
 Elachista catalana Parenti, 1978
 Elachista catalunella Traugott-Olsen, 1992
 Elachista chamaea Kaila, 2003
 Elachista chionella Mann, 1861
 Elachista cirrhoplica Kaila, 2012
 Elachista clintoni Traugott-Olsen, 1992
 Elachista constitella Frey, 1859
 Elachista contisella Chrétien, 1922
 Elachista cornuta Parenti, 1981
 Elachista cretula Kaila, 2011
 Elachista cuencaensis Traugott-Olsen, 1992
 Elachista curonensis Traugott-Olsen, 1990
 Elachista dalmatiensis Traugott-Olsen, 1992
 Elachista deceptricula Staudinger, 1880
 Elachista derbendi Parenti, 1981
 Elachista disemiella Zeller, 1847
 Elachista drenovoi Parenti, 1981
 Elachista dumosa Parenti, 1981
 Elachista elsaella Traugott-Olsen, 1988
 Elachista enochra Kaila, 2011
 Elachista esmeralda Parenti, 1981
 Elachista exigua Parenti, 1978
 Elachista filicornella Kaila, 1992
 Elachista flavescens Parenti, 1981
 Elachista fuscibasella Chrétien, 1915
 Elachista galactitella Eversmann, 1844
 Elachista galbina Kaila, 2012
 Elachista gebzeensis Traugott-Olsen, 1990
 Elachista gerdmaritella Traugott-Olsen, 1992
 Elachista gibbera Kaila, 2003
 Elachista gielisi Traugott-Olsen, 1992
 Elachista gilvula Kaila, 2012
 Elachista glaseri Traugott-Olsen, 1992
 Elachista gormella Nielsen & Traugott-Olsen, 1987
 Elachista graeca Parenti, 2002
 Elachista grandella Traugott-Olsen, 1992
 Elachista grotenfelti Kaila, 2012
 Elachista habeleri Traugott-Olsen, 1990
 Elachista hallini Traugott-Olsen, 1992
 Elachista hedemanni Rebel, 1899
 Elachista heringi Rebel, 1899
 Elachista hispanica Traugott-Olsen, 1992
 Elachista ilicrina Falkovich, 1986
 Elachista imbi Traugott-Olsen, 1992
 Elachista intrigella Traugott-Olsen, 1992
 Elachista jaeckhi Traugott-Olsen, 1990
 Elachista jubarella Kaila, 2011
 Elachista kabuli Parenti, 1981
 Elachista karsholti Traugott-Olsen, 1992
 Elachista kasyi Parenti, 1981
 Elachista klimeschiella Parenti, 2002
 Elachista latipenella Sinev & Budashkin, 1991
 Elachista lerauti Traugott-Olsen, 1992
 Elachista liskai Kaila, 2011
 Elachista louiseae Traugott-Olsen, 1992
 Elachista luqueti Traugott-Olsen, 1992
 Elachista maboulella Chretien, 1915
 Elachista maculata Parenti, 1978
 Elachista madridensis Traugott-Olsen, 1992
 Elachista mannella Traugott-Olsen, 1992
 Elachista manni Traugott-Olsen, 1990
 Elachista melancholica Frey, 1859
 Elachista michelseni Traugott-Olsen, 1992
 Elachista microdigitata Parenti, 1983
 Elachista minusculella Traugott-Olsen, 1992
 Elachista moroccoensis Traugott-Olsen, 1992
 Elachista modesta Parenti, 1978
 Elachista multipunctata Sruoga, 1990
 Elachista multipunctella Traugott-Olsen, 1992
 Elachista neapolisella Traugott-Olsen, 1985
 Elachista nevadensis Parenti, 1978
 Elachista nielspederi Traugott-Olsen, 1992
 Elachista nuraghella Amsel, 1951
 Elachista occidentella Traugott-Olsen, 1992
 Elachista occulta Parenti, 1978
 Elachista ohridella Parenti, 2001
 Elachista olemartini Traugott-Olsen, 1992
 Elachista olschwangi Kaila, 2003
 Elachista oukaimedenensis Traugott-Olsen, 1988
 Elachista ozeini Parenti, 2004
 Elachista parvula Parenti, 1978
 Elachista passerini Traugott-Olsen, 1996
 Elachista phragmitella Sruoga, 1992
 Elachista pocopunctella Traugott-Olsen, 1992
 Elachista pollutella Duponchel, 1843
 Elachista povolnyi Traugott-Olsen, 1992
 Elachista punctella Traugott-Olsen, 1992
 Elachista rikkeae Traugott-Olsen, 1992
 Elachista rissaniensis Traugott-Olsen, 1992
 Elachista rutjani Kaila, 2011
 Elachista senecai Traugott-Olsen, 1992
 Elachista sinevi Traugott (Sruoga, 1992)
 Elachista skulei Traugott-Olsen, 1992
 Elachista spumella Caradja, 1920
 Elachista steueri Traugott-Olsen, 1990
 Elachista subula Parenti, 1991
 Elachista svenssoni Traugott-Olsen, 1988
 Elachista szocsi Parenti, 1978
 Elachista teruelensis Traugott-Olsen, 1990
 Elachista totanaensis Traugott-Olsen, 1992
 Elachista toveella Traugott-Olsen, 1985
 Elachista tribertiella Traugott-Olsen, 1985
 Elachista turkensis Traugott-Olsen, 1990
 Elachista unicornis Parenti, 1991
 Elachista vanderwolfi Traugott-Olsen, 1992
 Elachista varensis Traugott-Olsen, 1992
 Elachista vartianae Parenti, 1981
 Elachista vegliae Parenti, 1978
 Elachista veletaella Traugott-Olsen, 1992
 Elachista vivesi Traugott-Olsen, 1992
 Elachista vulcana Kaila, 2011
 Elachista wadielhiraensis Traugott-Olsen, 1992
 Elachista zuernbaueri Traugott-Olsen, 1990

Subgenus Elachista (Atachia)
These are sorted in the presumed phylogenetic sequence.

gerasmia group, gerasmia section
Incertae sedis
 Elachista magidina
 Elachista floccella
 Elachista velutina
 Elachista carcharota
 Elachista crenatella
 Elachista bidens
 Elachista alampeta
 Elachista cursa
 Elachista eriodes
 Elachista illota
 Elachista ceratiola
 Elachista bilobella
 Elachista filiphila
 Elachista merista
 Elachista lopadina
 Elachista patania
 Elachista indigens
 Elachista cf. indigens
 Elachista averta
 Elachista anolba
 Elachista flavicilia
 Elachista tetraquetri
 Elachista effusi
 Elachista deusta
 Elachista rubiginosae
 Elachista ophelma
 Elachista catagma
 Elachista ruscella
 Elachista sarota
 Elachista syntomella
 Elachista scopulina
 Elachista nodosae
 Elachista discina

Elachista cynopa complex
 Elachista ligula
 Elachista toryna
 Elachista ascidiella
 Elachista repanda
 Elachista prolatella
 Elachista protensa
 Elachista campsella
 Elachista spinodora
 Elachista glossina
 Elachista opima
 Elachista pharetra
 Elachista rudicula
 Elachista corbicula
 Elachista mystropa
 Elachista trulla
 Elachista euthema
 Elachista cynopa
 Elachista epartica
 Elachista zeta
 Elachista chilotera
 Elachista mundula
 Elachista listrionea
 Elachista crumilla
 Elachista aposematica
 Elachista chloropepla

Elachista melanthes complex
 Elachista melanthes
 Elachista platysma
 Elachista stictifica
 Elachista lachnella
 Elachista cf. melanthes
Elachista gerasmia complex
 Elachista gerasmia
 Elachista physalodes
 Elachista peridiola
 Elachista phascola
Elachista paragauda complex
 Elachista paragauda
 Elachista toralis
 Elachista paryphoea
 Elachista spathacea
 Elachista cylistica
 Elachista fabarella
 Elachista etorella
 Elachista gladiograpta
 Elachista gladiatrix
 Elachista spongicola

gerasmia group, catarata section
 Elachista menura
 Elachista flammula
 Elachista crocospila
 Elachista glomerella
 Elachista sphaerella
 Elachista cf. sphaerella A
 Elachista cf. sphaerella B
 Elachista cf. sphaerella C
 Elachista cf. sphaerella D
 Elachista sapphirella

 Elachista patersoniae Kaila, 2011
 Elachista catarata Meyrick, 1897
 Elachista mutarata Kaila, 2011
 Elachista laterina Kaila, 2011
 Elachista ictera Kaila, 2011
 Elachista asperae Kaila, 2011
 Elachista ophthalma Kaila, 2011
 Elachista coalita Kaila, 2011
 Elachista corneola Kaila, 2011erebophthalma group Elachista erebophthalma
 Elachista evexa
 Elachista rhomboidea
 Elachista leucastrapuplesisi group Elachista helia Kaila & Sruoga, 2014
 Elachista puplesisi Sruoga, 2000

Subgenus Elachista (Hemiprosopa)
 Elachista altaica Sinev, 1998
 Elachista dasycara Kaila, 1999 (=albella (Chambers, 1877) nec Muller, 1776)

Subgenus Elachista (Elachista)

<div float="left">albifrontella/bifasciella group Elachista aerinella Kaila, 1999
 Elachista albifrontella (Hübner, [1817])
 Elachista alpinella
 Elachista amrodella Kaila, 1999
 Elachista apicipunctella
 Elachista aredhella Kaila, 1999
 Elachista arthadella Kaila, 1999
 Elachista atricomella
 Elachista baikalica Kaila, 1992
 Elachista bifasciella Treitschke, 1833
 Elachista bregorella Kaila, 1999
 Elachista caranthirella Kaila, 1999
 Elachista celegormella Kaila, 1999
 Elachista cicadella Kaila, 1999
 Elachista compsa Traugott-Olsen, 1974
 Elachista curufinella Kaila, 1999
 Elachista daeronella Kaila, 1999
 Elachista dagnirella Kaila, 1999
 Elachista deriventa Kaila & Mutanen, 2008
 Elachista diederichsiella E.Hering, 1889
 Elachista diorella Kaila, 1999
 Elachista dolabella Kaila, 1999
 Elachista elegans Frey, 1859
 Elachista excelsicola
 Elachista finarfinella Kaila, 1999
 Elachista fuscofrontella Sruoga, 1990
 Elachista gildorella Kaila, 1999
 Elachista gorlimella Kaila, 1999
 Elachista habrella
 Elachista haldarella Kaila, 1999
 Elachista hiranoi Sugisima, 2005
 Elachista indisella Kaila, 1999
 Elachista jaskai Kaila, 1998
 Elachista jupiter Sugisima, 2005
 Elachista kilmunella Stainton, 1849
 Elachista leifi Kaila & Kerppola, 1992
 Elachista luticomella
 Elachista maglorella Kaila, 1999
 Elachista marachella Kaila, 1999
 Elachista micalis
 Elachista morwenella Kaila, 1999
 Elachista nobilella
 Elachista olorinella Kaila, 1999
 Elachista phalaridis Parenti, 1983
 Elachista platina
 Elachista poae Stainton, 1855
 Elachista ragnorella Kaila, 1999
 Elachista scitula
 Elachista sulcsiella Savenkov, 2013
 Elachista tanaella Aarvik & Berggren, 2004
 Elachista tauronella Kaila, 1999
 Elachista telcharella Kaila, 1999
 Elachista telerella Kaila, 1999
 Elachista turgonella Kaila, 1999
 Elachista cf. bifasciella
 Elachista cf. kilmunella 'Chelyabinsk Oblast'
 Elachista cf. platina
 Elachista sp. 'Chelyabinsk Oblast'cerusella/monosemiella group Elachista anserinella Zeller, 1839
 Elachista lastrella Chrètien, 1896
 Elachista maculicerusella
 Elachista rufocinerea
 Elachista wieseriella Huemer, 2000 (tentatively placed here)gleichenella group Elachista enitescens Braun, 1921
 Elachista gerasimovi Sruoga, 2000
 Elachista gleichenella
 Elachista ievae Sruoga, 2008
 Elachista madarella (Clemens, 1860)
 Elachista nitensella Sinev & Sruoga, 1995
 Elachista regificella Sircom, 1849
 Elachista similis Sugisima, 2005
 Elachista tengstromi (tentatively placed here)orba group Elachista commoncommelinae
 Elachista cyanea
 Elachista polliae
 Elachista nielsencommelinae
 Elachista orba Meyrick 1921
 Elachista cf. orbapraelineata group Elachista amamii Parenti, 1983
 Elachista aranella Kaila, 1999
 Elachista aristoteliella Kaila, 1999
 Elachista aurita
 Elachista caliginosa Parenti, 1983
 Elachista eilinella Kaila, 1999
 Elachista fasciocaliginosa Sugisima, 2005
 Elachista guilinella Kaila, 1999
 Elachista ibunella Kaila, 1999
 Elachista kurokoi Parenti, 1983
 Elachista miriella Kaila, 1999
 Elachista miscanthi Parenti, 1983
 Elachista nienorella Kaila, 1999
 Elachista praelineata Braun 1915
 Elachista serindella Kaila, 1999
 Elachista turinella Kaila, 1999pulchella group Elachista canapennella
 Elachista eskoi
 Elachista herrichii Frey, 1859
 Elachista humilis
 Elachista krogeri Svensson, 1976
 Elachista nielswolffi Svensson, 1976
 Elachista orstadii Palm, 1943
 Elachista pomerana
 Elachista subnigrella Douglas, 1853
 Elachista vonschantzi Svensson, 1976
 Elachista zernyisolena group Elachista ignicolor
 Elachista solenasaccharella group Elachista dulcinella Kaila, 1999
 Elachista hedionella Kaila, 1999
 Elachista helodella Kaila, 1999
 Elachista saccharella Busck, 1934
 Elachista suavella Kaila, 1999
 Elachista uniolae Kaila, 1999

</div>"Cosmiotes"/freyerella groupIncertae sedis
 Elachista albrechti Kaila, 1998
 Elachista amseli (Parenti, 1981)
 Elachista antipetra Meyrick, 1922
 Elachista baltica E.Hering, 1891 (sometimes in E. freyerella; tentatively placed here)
 Elachista beorella Kaila, 1999
 Elachista consortella Stainton, 1851 (tentatively placed here)
 Elachista deficiens Meyrick, 1922
 Elachista epicaeria (Diakonoff, 1955)
 Elachista exactella (tentatively placed here)
 Elachista herbigrada Braun, 1925
 Elachista heteroplaca Meyrick, 1934
 Elachista galadella Kaila, 1999
 Elachista illectella (Clemens, 1860) (type of Cosmiotes)
 Elachista infuscata Frey, 1882 (sometimes in E. exactella; tentatively placed here)
 Elachista inscia (Meyrick, 1913)
 Elachista ksarella Chrétien, 1908
 Elachista laquaeorum (Dugdale, 1971)
 Elachista lorigera (Meyrick, 1921) (type of Ptilodoxa)
 Elachista neithanella Kaila, 1999
 Elachista nipponicella Sugisima, 2006
 Elachista nymphaea Meyrick, 1911
 Elachista obtusella Sruoga, 2008
 Elachista ochroleuca Meyrick 1923
 Elachista pallens (Sruoga, 1990)
 Elachista planicara Kaila, 1998
 Elachista quadrata Meyrick, 1932
 Elachista rianella Kaila, 1999
 Elachista spiculifera Meyrick, 1922
 Elachista stabilella Stainton, 1858 (tentatively placed here)
 Elachista stichospora Meyrick, 1932
 Elachista tuberella Sruoga, 2008
 Elachista tuorella Kaila, 1999

Elachista freyerella complex
 Elachista freyerella
 Elachista propera
 Elachista dieropa
 Elachista elaphria
 Elachista cycotis
 Elachista vitellina
 Elachista citrina
 Elachista cerebrosella
 Elachista melina
 Elachista gemadella
 Elachista ravella
 Elachista cerina
 Elachista diligens
 Elachista aepsera
 Elachista zophosema
 Elachista litharga
 Elachista levipes
 Elachista cerrita
 Elachista velox
 Elachista impiger
 Elachista alacera
 Elachista essymena
 Elachista festina

Elachista synethes complex
 Elachista fucosa
 Elachista seductilis
 Elachista synethes
 Elachista strenua
 Elachista sandaraca
 Elachista helvola
 Elachista delira
 Elachista cf. synethestetragonella group Elachista abiskoella Bengtsson, 1977
 Elachista agilis Braun, 1921
 Elachista albidella 
 Elachista biatomella (Stainton, 1848)
 Elachista bipunctella (Sinev & Sruoga, 1995)
 Elachista boursini Amsel, 1951
 Elachista christenseni Traugott-Olsen, 2000
 Elachista cinereopunctella (Haworth, 1828)
 Elachista cucullata Braun, 1921
 Elachista dimicatella Rebel, 1903
 Elachista eleochariella
 Elachista ensifera
 Elachista falirakiensis Traugott-Olsen, 2000
 Elachista fulgens Parenti, 1983 (tentatively placed here)
 Elachista glaserella Traugott-Olsen, 2000
 Elachista imatrella von Schantz, 1971
 Elachista jordanella Amsel, 1935
 Elachista juliensis Frey, 1870 = E. freyi Staudinger, 1871 (type of Biselachista)
 Elachista kebneella (Traugott-Olsen & Nielsen, 1977)
 Elachista kleini Amsel, 1935
 Elachista kobomugi Sugisima, 1999
 Elachista leucosticta Braun, 1948
 Elachista leucosyrma (Meyrick, 1932) (type of Platyphyllis)
 Elachista martinii Hofmann, [1898]
 Elachista nevadella Traugott-Olsen, 2000
 Elachista occidentalis Frey, 1882
 Elachista ornithopodella Frey, 1859
 Elachista pigerella (Herrich-Schäffer, 1854) (type of Atachia)
 Elachista quadripunctella (Hübner, [1825])
 Elachista ribentella Kaila & Varalda, 2004
 Elachista saarelai
 Elachista salinaris Braun, 1925
 Elachista scirpi Stainton, 1887
 Elachista serricornis
 Elachista spinigera (Sruoga, 1990)
 Elachista tetragonella (Herrich-Schäffer, 1855)
 Elachista trapeziella Stainton, 1849
 Elachista utonella Frey, 1856
 Elachista zabella Chrétien, 1908
 Elachista zonulae (Sruoga, 1992)
 Elachista cf. biatomella 'Ajat River'Elachista (Elachista) incertae sedis

 Elachista absaroka Kaila, 1996
 Elachista adelpha Kaila & Jalava, 1994
 Elachista albicapilla Höfner, 1918
 Elachista albicapitella Engel, 1907
 Elachista albisquamella Zeller, 1877
 Elachista amideta Braun, 1948
 Elachista amseli (Parenti, 1981)
 Elachista anserinelloides Nel, 2003
 Elachista aphanta Turner, 1923
 Elachista archaeonoma Meyrick, 1889
 Elachista argentifasciella Höfner, 1898
 Elachista argentosa Braun, 1920
 Elachista arnoldi (Koster, 1993)
 Elachista beothucella Kaila, 1996
 Elachista bicingulella Sruoga, 1992
 Elachista bifurcatella (Sinev & Sruoga, 1995)
 Elachista bisetella Sinev & Sruoga, 1995
 Elachista brachyelythrifoliella Clemens, 1864
 Elachista brachyplectra Meyrick, 1921
 Elachista brachypterella (Klimesch, 1990)
 Elachista bromella Chretien, 1915
 Elachista caelebs Meyrick, 1933
 Elachista calusella Kaila, 1996
 Elachista cana Braun, 1920
 Elachista canariella Nielsen & Traugott-Olsen, 1987
 Elachista canis Parenti, 1983
 Elachista cerasella Kaila, 1996
 Elachista ciliigera Kaila, 1996
 Elachista colouratella Sinev & Sruoga, 1995
 Elachista confirmata Meyrick, 1931
 Elachista contaminatella Zeller, 1847
 Elachista cornutifera (Sruoga, 1995)
 Elachista dubitella Sinev & Sruoga, 1995
 Elachista devexella Kaila, 2003
 Elachista differens Parenti, 1978
 Elachista encumeadae Kaila & Karsholt, 2002
 Elachista ermolenkoi Sinev & Sruoga, 1995
 Elachista exaula Meyrick, 1889
 Elachista falaxella Sinev & Sruoga, 1995
 Elachista fuliginea Braun, 1948
 Elachista fumosella Sinev & Sruoga, 1995
 Elachista geminatella (Herrich-Schäffer, 1855)
 Elachista glenni Kaila, 1996
 Elachista grandiferella Sruoga, 1992
 Elachista griseella (Duponchel, 1843)
 Elachista griseola Diakonoff, 1955
 Elachista gruenewaldi Parenti, 2002
 Elachista helonoma Meyrick, 1889
 Elachista huron Kaila, 1996
 Elachista ibericella Traugott-Olsen, 1995
 Elachista igaloensis (Amsel, 1951)
 Elachista inaudita Braun, 1927
 Elachista irenae Buszko, 1989
 Elachista irrorata Braun, 1920
 Elachista japonica (Parenti, 1983)
 Elachista kaszabi Parenti, 1991
 Elachista kebneella (Traugott-Olsen, 1977)
 Elachista kopetdagica (Sruoga, 1990)
 Elachista kosteri Traugott-Olsen, 1995
 Elachista lambeseella Nielsen & Traugott-Olsen, 1987
 Elachista latebrella Sinev & Sruoga, 1995
 Elachista lenape Kaila, 1996
 Elachista leucofrons Braun, 1920
 Elachista maculosella Chrétien, 1896
 Elachista maritimella McDunnough, 1942
 Elachista megagnathos Sruoga, 1990
 Elachista metallica Parenti, 1981
 Elachista minuta (Parenti, 2003)
 Elachista mongolica Parenti, 1991
 Elachista morandinii Huemer & Kaila, 2003
 Elachista multidentella Sinev & Sruoga, 1995
 Elachista napaea Philpot, 1930
 Elachista nearcha Meyrick, 1910
 Elachista nigrothoracella Sinev & Sruoga, 1995
 Elachista nitidiuscula Braun, 1948
 Elachista olgae (Sinev, 1992)
 Elachista ombrodoca Meyrick, 1889
 Elachista opacella Sinev & Sruoga, 1995
 Elachista optatella Sinev & Sruoga, 1995
 Elachista orientella Sinev & Sruoga, 1995
 Elachista parasella Traugott-Olsen, 1974
 Elachista pelaena Kaila, 1996
 Elachista plagiaula (Meyrick, 1938)
 Elachista pravella (Sinev & Sruoga, 1995)
 Elachista pusillella (Sinev & Sruoga, 1995)
 Elachista putris Meyrick, 1923
 Elachista pyrrha Kaila, 1996
 Elachista radiantella Braun, 1922
 Elachista rufella Sinev & Sruoga, 1995
 Elachista sagittifera Philpott, 1927
 Elachista sagittiferella Sinev & Sruoga, 1995
 Elachista sasae Sinev & Sruoga, 1995
 Elachista serra Kaila, 1996
 Elachista sicula Parenti, 1978
 Elachista simplimorphella Sinev & Sruoga, 1995
 Elachista solitaria Braun, 1922
 Elachista staintonella Chamber, 1878
 Elachista stenopterella Rebel, 1932
 Elachista stramineola Braun, 1921
 Elachista strepens Meyrick, 1922
 Elachista sylvestris Braun, 1920
 Elachista tabghaella Amsel, 1935
 Elachista talgarella Kaila, 1992
 Elachista tersella (Sinev & Sruoga, 1995)
 Elachista thallophora Meyrick, 1889
 Elachista vakshi (Sruoga, 1992)
 Elachista vinlandica Kaila, 1996
 Elachista watti Philpott, 1924

Other groups
Some Elachista are divided into groups whose relationships to the two large subgenera requires further study, including:
"Dibrachia" group
 Elachista alicanta Kaila, 2005
 Elachista anatoliensis Traugott-Olsen, 1990
 Elachista elksourensis Kaila, 2005
 Elachista kalki Parenti, 1978 (type of Dibrachia)
 Elachista totalbella Chrétien, 1908

"Irenicodes" group
 Elachista eurychora (Meyrick, 1919) (type of Irenicodes)
 Elachista galatheae (Viette, 1954) (type of Euproteodes)
 Elachista holdgatei (Bradley, 1965)
 Elachista hookeri (Dugdale, 1971)
 Elachista pumila (Dugdale, 1971)

Incertae sedis
Additional Elachista species are of even more uncertain relationships than usual for this genus:
 Elachista baikalica Kaila, 1992
 Elachista bassii Parenti, 2006
 Elachista beltira Kaila, 2000
 Elachista beriga Kaila, 2000
 Elachista bimaculata Parenti, 1981
 Elachista brevis Sruoga & J. de Prins, 2009
 Elachista chelonitis Meyrick, 1909 (type of Cleroptila)
 Elachista cordata Sruoga & J. de Prins, 2011
 Elachista delocharis Meyrick, 1932
 Elachista densa Parenti, 1981
 Elachista deresyensis Traugott-Olsen, 1988
 Elachista donia Kaila, 2000
 Elachista gibbera Kaila, 2003
 Elachista gypsophila Meyrick, 1911
 Elachista iriphaea (Meyrick, 1932)
 Elachista justificata Meyrick, 1926

 Elachista kakamegensis Sruoga & J. de Prins, 2009
 Elachista kherana Kaila, 2000
 Elachista longispina Sruoga & J. de Prins, 2009
 Elachista maculosa Parenti, 1981
 Elachista merimnaea Meyrick, 1920
 Elachista mus Parenti, 1981
 Elachista oritropha Bradley, 1965
 Elachista planca Sruoga & J. de Prins, 2009
 Elachista pusilla Frey & Boll, 1876
 Elachista semnani Parenti, 1981
 Elachista semophanta Meyrick, 1914
 Elachista sparsula Meyrick, 1921
 Elachista stelviella Amsel, 1932
 Elachista trifasciata (E. Wollaston, 1879)
 Elachista vasrana Kaila, 2000
 Elachista veruta Kaila, 2008

Placement within Elachista uncertain
 Elachista angularis (Braun, 1918)
 Elachista cupreella Blanchard, 1852
 Elachista endobela Meyrick, 1926
 Elachista hilda (Meyrick, 1932)
 Elachista infamiliaris Gozmany, 1957
 Elachista ladiniella Hartig, 1938
 Elachista leucosoma Meyrick, 1922
 Elachista maculoscella Clemens, 1860
 Elachista melanura Meyrick, 1889
 Elachista metallifera Lower, 1908
 Elachista oxycrates Meyrick, 1932
 Elachista petalistis Meyrick, 1932
 Elachista picroleuca (Meyrick, 1921)
 Elachista rubella Blanchard, 1852
 Elachista texanica Frey & Boll, 1876
 Elachista vastata Meyrick, 1932

Excluded species
The following species are excluded from the genus Elachista, but have not yet been placed in another genus:
 Elachista arctodyta Meyrick, 1897
 Elachista argopis Meyrick, 1897
 Elachista cataptila Meyrick, 1897
 Elachista demogenes Meyrick, 1897
 Elachista parvipulvella Chambers 1875

Former species
 Elachista antipodensis (Dugdale, 1971)
 Elachista arundinella (Duponchel, 1843)
 Elachista megerlella (Hubner, 1810)
 Elachista notosema (Meyrick, 1922)
 Elachista scythrodes (Turner, 1947)
 Elachista tersectella Zeller, 1875
 Elachista toropis Meyrick, 1897

Synonyms
Invalid scientific names (junior synonyms and others) of Elachista in the circumscription as presented here are:
 Aphelosetia Stephens, 1834
 Aphigalia Dyar, [1903]
 Atachia Wocke in Heinemann, [1876]
 Atmozostis Meyrick, 1932
 Atrinia Sinev, 1992
 Biselachista Traugott-Olsen & Schmidt Nielsen, 1977
 Cleroptila Meyrick, 1909
 Cosmiotes Clemens, 1860
 Cycnodia Herrich-Schäffer, 1853
 Dibrachia Sinev & Sruoga, 1992
 Dicasteris Meyrick, 1906
 Dicranoctetes Braun, 1918
 Donacivola Busck, 1934
 Elachistoides Sruoga, 1992

 Elaschista (lapsus)
 Euproteodes Viette, 1954
 Eupneusta Bradley, 1974
 Hecista Wallengren, 1881
 Hemiprosopa Braun, 1948
 Illantis Meyrick, 1921
 Irenicodes Meyrick, 1919
 Neaera Chambers, 1880  (non Robineau-Desvoidy, 1830: preoccupied)
 Paraperittia Rebel, 1916
 Phigalia Chambers, 1875 (non Duponchel, 1829: preoccupied)
 Platyphyllis Meyrick, 1932
 Ptilodoxa Meyrick, 1921
 Svenssonia Parenti, 2009

Footnotes

References

  (2008): Australian Faunal Directory – Elachista. Version of 9 October 2008. Retrieved 1 May 2010.
  (2009): Elachista. Version 2.1, 22 December 2009. Retrieved 1 May 2010.
  (2011): Elachistine Moths of Australia (Lepidoptera: Gelechioidea, Elachistidae) (Monographs on Australian Lepidoptera Series 11). CSIRO Publishing. . Preview at Google Books
  (1973): Schmetterlinge Oberösterreichs (Vol. 6: Microlepidoptera) [in German]. Landwirtschaftskammer für Oberösterreich.
  (2004): Butterflies and Moths of the World, Generic Names and their Type-species – Elachista. Version of 5 November 2004. Retrieved 1 May 2010.
  (2008): Markku Savela's Lepidoptera and Some Other Life Forms – Elachista. Version of 19 July 2008. Retrieved 1 May 2010.

 
Elachistidae
Moth genera
Taxa named by Ferdinand Ochsenheimer
Taxa named by Georg Friedrich Treitschke